Shelley Taylor Morgan (born September 3, 1950) is an American actress who is best known for her playing Lorena Sharpe in the TV series General Hospital in the mid-1980s.

Acting career
Morgan began her career solely as an actress but eventually branched out to hosting, co-hosting, and contributing editor stints on a variety of shows.

Some acting highlights include Scarface, Days of Our Lives, Archie Bunker's Place, The Sword and the Sorcerer, ABC's Once and Again, Tales from the Crypt, and a role on Hunter where she created Kitty, a flaky but intelligent detective who appeared on several episodes of the series over two seasons.

The role that began her pursuit of an acting career was appearing in Marilyn: The Untold Story.

Her most popular hosting credits include E! Entertainment Television's first live show, Pure Soap - a talk show for soap opera addicts, which ran from October 1993 until November 1994.  Other duties at E! were hosting Coming Attractions, The Daytime Emmy Awards and the Soap Opera Digest Awards. She also hosted on ABC's The Home Show, AM Los Angeles, and HGTV's Surprise Gardener.

Stage roles include the controversial Steambath, a co-starring role with Don Knotts, Rue McClanahan and Randolph Mantooth in The Mind with the Dirty Man, and starring roles in the original plays Backbone of America at the Tiffany Theater in Los Angeles, and Aspirins and Elephants.

References

External links
 
 Shelley Taylor Morgan at The New York Times

1950 births
Actresses from Los Angeles
Actresses from West Virginia
American film actresses
American soap opera actresses
Living people
Actors from Charleston, West Virginia
Place of birth missing (living people)
University of California, Los Angeles alumni
University High School (Los Angeles) alumni
21st-century American women